Charles Ernest Naismith OBE (31 May 1881 – 2 November 1964) was an Australian rules footballer who played with Fitzroy. He was the twin brother of Wally Naismith.

After his football career, he worked in the dairy industry and was appointed an Officer of the Order of the British Empire in January 1954 for his services to the industry.

Notes

References
Holmesby, Russell & Main, Jim (2009). The Encyclopedia of AFL Footballers. 8th ed. Melbourne: Bas Publishing.

External links
 
 

1881 births
1964 deaths
Australian rules footballers from Melbourne
Australian Rules footballers: place kick exponents
Fitzroy Football Club players
Australian twins
Twin sportspeople
People from Prahran, Victoria
Australian Officers of the Order of the British Empire